The Military Ordinariate of Portugal is a military ordinariate of the Roman Catholic Church. Immediately subject to the Holy See, it provides pastoral care to Roman Catholics serving in the Portuguese Armed Forces and their families.

History
It was established as a military vicariate 29 May 1966, and was elevated to a military ordinariate on 21 July 1986.

Office holders

Military vicars
 Manuel Gonçalves Cerejeira (appointed 1966 – retired 1972)
 António Ribeiro (appointed 24 January 1972 – became Military Ordinary 21 July 1986)

Military ordinaries
 António Ribeiro (appointed 21 July 1986 – died 24 March 1998)
 Januário Torgal Mendes Ferreira (2001–2013)
 Manuel da Silva Rodrigues Linda (2013–2018)
Rui Manuel Sousa Valério (2018 -)

References

 Ordinariato Castrense (Official website)
 Military Ordinariate of Portugal  (Catholic-Hierarchy)
 Ordinariato Castrense de Portugal / Diocese das Forças Armadas e de Segurança (GCatholic.org)

Portugal
Portugal